The 2009 Challenger Salinas Diario Expreso, also known as 2009 Abierto Internacional de Salinas was a professional tennis tournament played on outdoor hard courts. It was part of the 2009 ATP Challenger Tour. It took place in Salinas, Ecuador between January 12 and January 18, 2009.

Singles main-draw entrants

Seeds

 Rankings are as of January 5, 2009.

Other entrants
The following players received wildcards into the singles main draw:
  Alejo Apud
  Carlos Avellán
  Júlio César Campozano
  Eric Nunez

The following players received entry from the qualifying draw:
  Máximo González
  Carlos Salamanca
  Daniel Silva
  Izak van der Merwe

Champions

Men's singles

 Santiago Giraldo def.  Michael Russell, 6–3, 6–2

Men's doubles

 Sanchai Ratiwatana /  Sonchat Ratiwatana def.  Juan Pablo Brzezicki /  Iván Miranda, 6–3, 7–6(4)

External links
Draw
Official website

Challenger Salinas Diario Expreso
Challenger ATP de Salinas Diario Expreso